Bartosz Fabiniak (born September 17, 1982 in Szczecin) is a Polish retired footballer.

Career

Club
Fabiniak has successfully made it through the ranks of the Polish league system having started way down in the fourth tier.
In January 2011, he joined Pogoń Szczecin on -year contract.

References

External links
 

1982 births
Living people
Polish footballers
Association football goalkeepers
Pogoń Szczecin players
Widzew Łódź players
Olimpia Grudziądz players
Sportspeople from Szczecin